Asociația Club Sportiv Foresta Suceava, commonly known as Foresta Suceava or simply as Foresta, is a professional football club from Romania, based in Suceava, Suceava County and founded in 1946 as Locomotiva Ițcani. Previously, the club changed its name to A.S. C.F.R. Ițcani as well. At the end of the 2017–2018 season finished 18th out of 20 teams and were relegated to the third league. They currently play in Liga III, Seria I, after finishing 2nd in the 2019–20.

History

Foresta Suceava was founded as Rapid CFR Suceava to continue the football tradition in the city of Suceava after the dissolution of FC Cetatea Suceava, CSM Suceava (Bucovina Suceava) and NC Foresta Suceava. In the 2011–2012 season the club managed to win Liga III and as such to gain promotion to Liga II. Thus, since the 2011–2012 season, Rapid CFR Suceava has played in Liga II, the second tier of the Romanian football system.

Rapid started the 2014–2015 Liga II season with good results: 3 wins and 2 draws. One result was the home match against Săgeata Năvodari, a club which had previously played in Liga I for the very first time in its history during the 2013–2014 season, when Rapid fell behind twice but managed to equalise each time. Mircea Negru and Marius Matei managed to score the goals for Rapid in that respective match. In the 5th fixture Rapid encountered CS Balotești. Rapid were losing 1–0 until the 88th minute, but won with two goals scored by Cătălin Golofca and Sascha Marinkovic. Along with this win, Rapid reached second place in Seria I of Liga II with 11 points after 5 matches.

In the 2014–2015 season the club additionally managed to qualify for the Round of 16 of the domestic cup competition Cupa României following a 1–0 win over Liga I side Gaz Metan Mediaș in the Round of 32 on September 23, 2014. After the Round of 32, Rapid Suceava alongside Dacia Mioveni were the only two football clubs from the second division to qualify in the next phase after both having managed to obtain their qualifications from blowout results with teams higher rated than them from the first tier. Nonetheless, beforehand defeating Gaz Metan Mediaș, Rapid did also win two other domestic cup matches against Liga III sides CS Știința Miroslava (3–0) and Cetatea Târgu Neamț (1–0), both away, which made the club obtain a flawless performance with 7 consecutive positive results in both competitions.

At the end of the 2015–16 Liga II season, Rapid CFR Suceava was relegated to Liga III, but maintained the hope to remain in Liga II after more clubs announced that they would not enroll because of the financial problems.

In the middle of 2016 the team changed its name from Rapid CFR Suceava to Foresta Suceava, a name that binds the most important results of the football from Suceava.

Colours and badge

Rapid Suceava used a similar home kit to that of CFR Cluj, namely a white-burgundy one. During away matches they played wearing a black and blue kit.
After the rebranding, the new Foresta use a kit that combines yellow and green colors.

Stadium

Foresta Suceava plays its home matches on the Areni Stadium. The stadium has a total capacity of 12,500 seats and was opened in 1963 as the Municipal Stadium. Additionally, the stadium was also renovated between the periods 1976–1977, 1980–1982 and 2002 respectively. It is currently ranked 31st in the all time ranking table of stadiums from Romania.

Honours
Liga III
Winners (1): 2011–12
Runners-up (3): 2019–20, 2020–21, 2021–22
Liga IV – Suceava County
Winners (1): 2007–08

Players

First-team squad

Out on loan

Club officials

Board of directors

Current technical staff

League history

References

External links
 Foresta's page at frf.ro
 Foresta's page at liga2.ro
 Foresta's page at campionate.ro
 
 Rapid a incheiat campania de transferari (Romanian)
 Rapidistii vor intra pe gazonul de pe Areni odata cu adversarii din prima etapa (Romanian)

External links
 Supporters website
 

 
Association football clubs established in 1946
Football clubs in Suceava County
Liga II clubs
Liga III clubs
Liga IV clubs
1946 establishments in Romania